Tarcisio Lopes da Silva (born January 10, 1991 in Paulista), better known as Pingo, is a Brazilian football who is currently plays as a striker.

References

External links
  Ogol
  Soccerway

1991 births
Living people
Sportspeople from Pernambuco
Association football forwards
Brazilian footballers
Brazilian expatriate footballers
Campinense Clube players
América Futebol Clube (RN) players
Ceará Sporting Club players
ABC Futebol Clube players
Santa Cruz Futebol Clube players
Red Bull Brasil players
Clube de Regatas Brasil players
Botafogo Futebol Clube (PB) players
Associação Desportiva Confiança players
Resende Futebol Clube players
Ituano FC players
Centro Sportivo Alagoano players
Bangu Atlético Clube players
Hetten FC players
Goytacaz Futebol Clube players
Muscat Club players
Al-Sadd FC (Saudi football club) players
Campeonato Brasileiro Série B players
Campeonato Brasileiro Série C players
Campeonato Brasileiro Série D players
Saudi First Division League players
Saudi Second Division players
Brazilian expatriate sportspeople in Saudi Arabia
Brazilian expatriate sportspeople in Oman
Expatriate footballers in Saudi Arabia
Expatriate footballers in Oman

Association football midfielders
People from Paulista